Sheung Wan is a station on the  of the Hong Kong MTR network. The station serves the neighbourhood of Sheung Wan and the western part of Central District. The livery colour of this station is khaki.

The station was originally planned in 1970 as Western Market but its construction was discontinued after further planning for the new lines. Upon the construction of the Island line, the station was finally constructed and opened on 23 May 1986.

History
The station was originally proposed under the name Western Market in the 1967 Hong Kong Mass Transport Study, and was to be the southbound terminus of Kwun Tong line as well as its interchange with the Island line. Due to economic and contractual difficulties, the Hong Kong Government decided not to proceed with the construction of the full system, and the Island line was put on hold.

Works on the station commenced in June 1982 and the construction contract was awarded to a –Aoki joint venture.

The station was originally planned to open along with the rest of the line, but works on the station were delayed by the reprovisioning of government offices in the Fire Brigade Building (where Hang Seng Bank Head Office now stands) and the fruit wholesale market on New Market Street, which had to be demolished for the setting up of vertical shaft and crossover box, respectively. 

It was not until 23 May 1986 that Sheung Wan station was opened as the western terminus of the Island line. There is a plaque in the station concourse, unveiled by Financial Secretary John Henry Bremridge, commemorating the completion of the Island line. 

Sheung Wan served as the western terminus of the Island line until the extension of the line to Kennedy Town in 2014.

Station layout

The platforms are built under Des Voeux Road Central from Cleverly Street to Rumsey Street. Although platforms 1 and 2 are parallel and directly opposite to each other, there is a wall separating the two tracks giving a false impression that both platforms are separated by a long distance from each other.

Rumsey Street platforms

The platforms of Rumsey station, originally planned as the southern terminus of the East Kowloon line, still remain in Sheung Wan station. They are located near Exit E, forming part of the passageways between the concourse and the open platforms, and they run perpendicular to the Island line platforms below.

In recent years, one of the proposals for the usage of the Rumsey Street platforms has been for them to be the terminus of the West Island line (then a separate line). However, with the decision to make the West Island line to be an extension of the Island line instead of a separate line, there are no more proposals to utilise the Rumsey Street platforms. Since then, the MTR Corporation has covered up the abandoned platform edges with new walls, and they are no longer visible.

Entrances and exits
The station comprises two separate concourses, namely the central concourse near Hillier Street, and the east concourse beneath  near Rumsey Street. The non-paid areas of the two concourses are not interconnected within the station.

 Central concourse
A1: Des Voeux Road Central
A2: Wing Lok Street, Bonham Strand, Hollywood Road
B: Hillier Street, OTB Building, Western Market
C: Connaught Road Central, Chu Kong Shipping Tower, Guangdong Investment Tower
D: Hong Kong–Macau Ferry Terminal, China Merchants Tower, Shun Tak Centre

 East concourse
E1/E2: Rumsey Street
E3/E4/E5 : Infinitus Plaza

Transport connections

Hong Kong Tramways
Commuters can get out of Sheung Wan station at Exits A1, B, E1 or E3 to get to the tramways on Des Voeux Road Central, for their journey further westwards to Sai Ying Pun, Shek Tong Tsui and Kennedy Town.

Hong Kong-Macau Ferry
The Hong Kong–Macau Ferry Terminal, located within Shun Tak Centre, provides frequent jetfoil, hydrofoil and hovercraft services to Macau and many other destinations in the Pearl River Delta. Exit D leads to the Ferry Terminal.

References

MTR stations on Hong Kong Island
Island line (MTR)
Sheung Wan
Railway stations in Hong Kong opened in 1986